Copley Hall could refer to:

Copley Hall, a dormitory at Georgetown University
Copley Symphony Hall, in San Diego, California
Copley Hall, Boston